Adel Adili (born 6 September 1974) is a Libyan long-distance runner. He competed in the men's marathon at the 1996 Summer Olympics and the 2000 Summer Olympics.

References

External links

1974 births
Living people
Athletes (track and field) at the 1996 Summer Olympics
Athletes (track and field) at the 2000 Summer Olympics
Libyan male long-distance runners
Libyan male marathon runners
Olympic athletes of Libya
Place of birth missing (living people)